All About the Future is a 1953 anthology of science fiction short stories selected by American editor Martin Greenberg. The stories originally appeared in the magazines Astounding SF, Galaxy Science Fiction and the Boston University Graduate Journal.

Contents
 Foreword, by Martin Greenberg
 "Where To?", by Robert A. Heinlein
 "Let’s Not", by Isaac Asimov
 "The Midas Plague", by Frederik Pohl
 "Un-Man", by Poul Anderson
 "Granny Won’t Knit", by Theodore Sturgeon
 "Natural State", by Damon Knight
 "Hobo God", by Malcolm Jameson
 "Blood Bank", by Walter M. Miller, Jr.
 "Origins of Galactic Etiquette", by Edward Wellen
 "Origins of Galactic Law", by Edward Wellen
 "Origins of Galactic Slang", by Edward Wellen
 "Origins of Galactic Medicine", by Edward Wellen

Sources

External links

1955 anthologies
Science fiction anthologies
Books with cover art by Ed Emshwiller
Gnome Press books